Graniteville Historic District may refer to:

 Graniteville Historic District (Waterford, Connecticut), listed on the NRHP in Connecticut
 Graniteville Historic District (Westford, Massachusetts), listed on the NRHP in Massachusetts
Graniteville Historic District (South Carolina), listed on the NRHP in South Carolina